Habemus papam or Papam habemus ('We have a pope') is the announcement traditionally given by the protodeacon of the College of Cardinals (the senior cardinal deacon in the College) or by the senior cardinal deacon participating in the papal conclave, in Latin, upon the election of a new pope of the Roman Catholic Church.

The announcement is made from the central balcony (loggia) of St. Peter's Basilica in the Vatican, overlooking St. Peter's Square. After the announcement, the new pope is presented to the people and he gives his first Urbi et Orbi blessing.

Format
The format for the announcement when a cardinal is elected pope is:

Annuntio vobis gaudium magnum;
habemus Papam:

Eminentissimum ac Reverendissimum Dominum,
Dominum [first name]
Sanctae Romanae Ecclesiae Cardinalem [surname]
qui sibi nomen imposuit [papal name].

In English, it can be translated as:

I announce to you a great joy;
we have a pope:

The most eminent and most reverend lord,
Lord [first name]
Cardinal of the Holy Roman Church [surname]
who has taken the name [papal name].

In the Habemus papam announcement given by Cardinal Jorge Medina on April 19, 2005, upon the election of Pope Benedict XVI, the announcement was preceded by an identical greeting in several languages, respectively, Italian, Spanish, French, German and English:

Dear brothers and sisters.

History
The text of the announcement is partly inspired by the Gospel of Luke (2:10–11), which records the words of the angel announcing to the shepherds the birth of the Messiah:

"Fear not; for, behold, I bring thee good tidings of great joy, that shall be to all the people: For unto thee is born, this day, in the city of David a Saviour, which is Christ the Lord."

Note that, in the Vulgate (the Latin translation of the Bible by St. Jerome), the words used are "Evangelizo vobis gaudium magnum", while the word "annuntio" was used in previous translations.

The adoption of this formula is dated from the election of Odo Colonna as Pope Martin V (1417), who was chosen as the new pope by the cardinals and representatives from different countries at the Council of Constance. In this context, prior to Martin V, there were three claimants to the papal throne: Antipope John XXIII (who had called for the council, and appointed most of the cardinal electors), Antipope Benedict XIII (the only one to have been named cardinal before the outbreak of the Western Schism) and Pope Gregory XII. The first two were deposed by the Council itself, and Gregory XII abdicated after formally convoking the already convened council and authorizing its acts including the act of electing his successor. Two years after the first two contenders were deposed and the resignation of the third, the council elected the new pope. The announcement, therefore, could be interpreted as: "(Finally) we have a pope (and only one!)".

The adoption of the Habemus papam formula took place prior to 1484, the year in which it was used to announce the election of Giovanni Battista Cybo, who took the name of Innocent VIII.

Announcement
In announcing the name of the newly elected pontiff, the new pontiff's birth first name is announced in Latin in the accusative case (e.g. Carolum, Iosephum, Georgium Marium), but the new pontiff's surname is announced in the undeclined form (e.g. Wojtyła, Ratzinger, Bergoglio). The new papal name has usually been given in the genitive case in Latin, corresponding to the translation "who takes the name of ..." (e.g. Ioannis vigesimi tertii, Ioannis Pauli primi), although it can also be declined in the accusative case, corresponding to the translation "who takes the name ...", as was the case in 1963 and in 2013, when Pope Paul VI's and Pope Francis's regnal names were announced as Paulum sextum and Franciscum, respectively. In the situation where the name is declined in the genitive, the name is considered as a complement of the noun "nomen" while in the instance where the name is declined in the accusative, it is considered as an apposition of the direct object complement nomen in the accusative.  Both forms are equally correct. According to certain Latin grammarians though, like Nicola Fiocchini, Piera Guidotti Bacci and the Maiorum Lingua Manual, the accusative is the more correct form.

During the announcement of Pope Paul VI's election, protodeacon Alfredo Ottaviani used the conjunction et (which also means "and") instead of ac, the word usually used for "and" within the formula (he said Eminentissimum et reverendissimum instead of Eminentissimum ac reverendissimum).

During the announcement of Pope Benedict XVI's election, his regnal name was declined by Cardinal Medina in the genitive case (he said Benedicti decimi sexti), but in the Holy See website, the page announcing his election with a copy of the Habemus Papam formula has Benedict's regnal name declined in the accusative case (i.e., Benedictum XVI)

If a papal name is used for the first time, the announcement may or may not use the numeral the first. In John Paul I's election, the numeral primi (the first) was used (Cardinal Pericle Felici announced the papal name as Ioannis Pauli primi) but in Pope Francis' election, no numeral was uttered (Cardinal Jean-Louis Tauran simply gave the papal name as Franciscum).

The numeral in the papal name if it exists can be omitted if the new regnal name is the same as the one used by the immediate predecessor, as was the case in October 1978, when Pope John Paul II's regnal name was announced simply as Ioannis Pauli without the numeral, since his immediate predecessor was Pope John Paul I. It also happened in 1939, when Pope Pius XII's regnal name, following his election, was announced simply as Pium since his immediate predecessor was Pope Pius XI. In the announcement of Pope Pius XII's election, his regnal name was declined in the accusative, like the later announcements for Paul VI's and Francis's elections.

Actual examples
The following are examples of how the names were announced as noted on existing videos and recordings. The case and inclusion or exclusion of numeral for the papal names are noted.

Evolution of the formula 
From the beginning, the Habemus papam did not follow a strict formula, but varied in considerable form for many years. The table shows selected announcements given since the 1484 papal conclave.

List of cardinals who have given the announcement

Notes

References

Election of the Pope
Latin religious words and phrases